The Sony Ericsson W980 is a clamshell mobile phone that was announced on 10 February 2008. It was their flagship Walkman device at the time. The W980 is packed with many features, including 8-gigabytes of flash memory, HSDPA and a built-in FM transmitter (one of the very earliest on the market). With the clamshell closed the user can use the Walkman with an external touch screen illuminated with orange lights which will flash to the rhythm of the music being played for a few moments. This feature runs while the phone is being used but turns off after a few moments when the phone becomes idle.

It also has a 3.2 megapixel camera. Picture DJ allows one to edit the photo's light settings, colour and other visuals without needing to connect to a computer. The phone will also rotate a portrait photograph if it is taken in landscape mode with the photo fix feature. This will also automatically adjust the lighting of the photo - if it is too dark it will make it lighter. 3G video calling is also made possible with a forward-facing camera built into the screen of the phone.

Features

Audio 
7 mp3 message alert tones
17 m4a, 1 midi, 1 mp4 and 7 mp3 ringtones
9 Walkman equalizer presets
Ability to manually edit equalizer
FM transmitter
SensMe
Shazam TrackID application to identify music
Sound recorder
MusicDJ

Camera 
3.2 megapixel
Night mode
Self-timer
Automatic or manual white balance
3 effects
Picture review (observe a photo immediately after taking it)
Geographical location
4 shutter sounds
Option to turn off microphone during video record
VideoDJ
PhotoDJ

References

External links 
 Official Webpage

W980
Mobile phones introduced in 2008